This is a list of television programs broadcast by AMC.

Current programming

Drama

Comedy

Anthology

Unscripted

Variety

Co-productions

Acquired programming
Creepshow (2020)
Happy Valley (2021)
Kin (2021)
That Dirty Black Bag (2022)
Documentary Now! (2022)
Sherman's Showcase (2022)

Upcoming programming

Drama

Anthology

Miniseries

Co-productions

In development
Alan Wake
The Devil in Silver
Diligence
Good Night, and Good Luck
Max Headroom
A Message From the State
Neglected Murderesses
Queen of the Jungle
Seconds
They Can't Kill Us All
Untitled Bannerman series
Untitled Killing Eve spin-off

Former programming

Drama
Mad Men (2007–15) 
Breaking Bad (2008–13)
Rubicon (2010)
The Walking Dead (2010–22)
The Killing (2011–13)
Hell on Wheels (2011–16)
Low Winter Sun (2013)
TURИ: Washington's Spies (2014–17)
Halt and Catch Fire (2014–17)
Better Call Saul (2015–22)
Into the Badlands (2015–19)
Preacher (2016–19)
Feed the Beast (2016)
The Son (2017–19)
Dietland (2018)
Lodge 49 (2018–19)
NOS4A2 (2019–20)
The Walking Dead: World Beyond (2020–21)
Firebite (2021–22)
61st Street (2022)
Moonhaven (2022)

Comedy
Remember WENN (1996–98)
The Lot (1999–2001)
Kevin Can F**k Himself (2021–2022)

Anthology
The Terror (2018–19)
Dispatches from Elsewhere (2020)
Soulmates (2020)

Miniseries
Broken Trail (2006)
The Prisoner (2009)

Animation
Ultra City Smiths (2021)
Slippin' Jimmy (2022)
Pantheon (2022)

Unscripted

Docuseries
Movies That Shook the World (2005)
The Making of the Mob (2015–16)
The American West (2016)
Robert Kirkman's Secret History of Comics (2017)
James Cameron's Story of Science Fiction (2018)
Eli Roth's History of Horror (2018–21)
Hip Hop: The Songs That Shook America (2019)
The Preppy Murders: Death in Central Park (2019)

Reality
The Movie Masters (1989–90)
Cinema Secrets (2001–03)
FilmFakers (2004)
Comic Book Men (2012–18)
The Pitch (2012–13)
Small Town Security (2012–14)
Freakshow (2013–14)
Immortalized (2013)
Owner's Manual (2013)
Showville (2013)
Game of Arms (2014)
4th and Loud (2014)
Ride with Norman Reedus (2016–21)

Variety
DVD TV (2002–08)
Shootout (2003–08)
Talking Bad (2013)
Talking Saul (2016–22)
Talking Preacher (2016–17)
Geeking Out (2016)
Talking with Chris Hardwick (2017)
Unapologetic with Aisha Tyler (2018)
Friday Night In with The Morgans (2020)

Co-productions
Hustle (2006–12)
Humans (2015–18)
The Night Manager (2016)
Loaded (2017)
McMafia (2018)
The Little Drummer Girl (2018)
La Fortuna (2022)
This Is Going to Hurt (2022)

Acquired programming
This Is Your Life (1988)
The Three Stooges (1998–2004; 2009)
Dallas (2007)
CSI: Miami (2012)
Rawhide (2012)
Orphan Black (2015–17)
M*A*S*H (2017)
Blue Planet II (2018)
Dynasties (2019–22)
Two and a Half Men (2019–22)
Killing Eve (2019–22)
A Discovery of Witches (2019–22)
Quiz (2020)
Seven Worlds, One Planet (2020)
The Salisbury Poisonings (2021)
Cold Courage (2021)
Spy City (2021)
Weird Wonders of the World (2021)
Too Close (2021)
The Beast Must Die (2021)
The North Water (2021)
Eden: Untamed Planet (2021)
Broke (2021)
Anna (2021)
Anne Boleyn (2021)
Horror Noire (2022)
The Ipcress File (2022)
Slo Pitch (2022)

Notes

References

AMC